Eighteenth Century Collections Online (ECCO) is a digital collection of books published in Great Britain during the 18th century.

Gale, an education publishing company in the United States, assembled the collection by digitally scanning microfilm reproductions of 136,291 titles. Documents scanned after 2002 are added to a second collection, ECCO II. As of January 2014, ECCO II comprises 46,607 titles.

Conversions and access
So far 2,231 texts have been released free to the public through the work of the University of Michigan’s Text Creation Partnership. Rather than OCR, they rekey the texts and tag them with TEI. Their aim is to enable improved access to a fraction of the collection: they are making SGML/XML text editions for 10,000 books. In addition to the free version, subscription access is also offered.

Text analytic tools are available on this subset through the Text Analysis Portal for Research project.

One of the "Text Creation Partners", the University of Oxford, has converted the public domain texts into free, publicly accessible versions, in accordance with the Text Encoding Initiative P5 guidelines, and makes them available in a variety of file formats, including HTML and EPUB via the Oxford Text Archive.

Cross-search is also available from ProQuest for those who subscribe to both Early English Books Online and ECCO.

Reviews

See also
 American Society for Eighteenth-Century Studies
 Book scanning
 British Society for Eighteenth-Century Studies
 Burney Collection
 English Short-Title Catalogue
 Books in the United Kingdom

References

 Levack, Kinley. Digital ECCOs of the eighteenth century. EContent. November 1, 2003.
 Poyntz, Nick. The future of the past: digital technology is rapidly changing the nature and scope of historical enquiry for both academics and enthusiasts.  introduces a new series that examines these revolutionary developments. History Today. April 1, 2010.
 Martin, Shawn. Introduction. Doing Translation History in EEBO and ECCO Early Modern Literary Studies. 14.2/Special Issue 17 September 1, 2008—papers from a conference called  Bringing Text Alive: The Future of Scholarship, Pedagogy, and Electronic Publication about how databases including ECCO have impacted scholarship

External links
 
 Digital version with EPUBs at Oxford — 
 Eighteenth Century Collections Online Text Creation Partnership (ECCO–TCP), University of Michigan Library, searchable SGML/XML-encoded texts

Databases in the United Kingdom
British digital libraries
Early modern printing databases
Mass digitization
Online databases
Textual scholarship
18th-century documents